Heraclides of Erythrae (fl. 1st century BC), a physician of Erythrae in Ionia, who was a pupil of Chrysermus, a fellow-pupil of Apollonius, and a contemporary of Strabo in the 1st century BC. Galen calls him the most distinguished of the pupils of Chrysermus, and mentions a work written by him, On the school of Herophilus, consisting of at least seven books. He wrote a commentary on the sixth book of Hippocrates, De Morbis Vulgaribus, but neither this nor any of his writings survive.

Notes

1st-century BC Greek physicians
1st-century BC writers
Ionians
Writers of lost works